Tropidonophis multiscutellatus, the many-scaled keelback, is a species of colubrid snake. It is found in Papua New Guinea and Indonesia.

References

Tropidonophis
Reptiles of Indonesia
Reptiles of Papua New Guinea
Reptiles described in 1948
Taxa named by Leo Brongersma